John F. Kennedy Boulevard or Kennedy Boulevard may refer to:

John F. Kennedy Boulevard (Tampa, Florida), a major east–west corridor in Tampa, Florida
John F. Kennedy Boulevard (Houston, Texas), a major north-south boulevard in Houston, Texas.
County Route 501 (New Jersey) in Hudson County, New Jersey
Boulevard East in North Hudson, New Jersey
County Route 625 (Cape May County, New Jersey) in Sea Isle City, New Jersey
A section of westbound Pennsylvania Route 3 in Center City, Philadelphia
The main thoroughfare in Managua, Nicaragua, which is also known as Carretera Norte.

See also
John F. Kennedy Boulevard Bridge, built in 1959 and reconstructed 2009 by the Pennsylvania Department of Transportation
John F. Kennedy Memorial Highway (disambiguation)